Mary Irwin may refer to:

 Mary Ann Irwin (born 1960), Irish politician
 Mary Jane Irwin (21st century), American computer scientist